Ann Ferguson (born 6 March 1938), is an American philosopher, and Professor Emerita of Philosophy and Women's Studies at the University of Massachusetts Amherst. She served as Amherst's director of women's studies from 1995 to 2001. She is known for her work on feminist theory.

Career

After earning her PhD from Brown University, Ferguson joined the faculty at the University of Massachusetts Amherst as a lecturer. In 1967, Ferguson began to help her students access then-illegal abortions. By 1995, she was appointed Director of Women's Studies for a three-year term.

She established the Ann Ferguson Women and Gender Studies Scholarship in 2007 before retiring.

Selected books

References

External links
 Profile: Ann Ferguson GEXcel:Gendering EXcellence - Centre of Gender Excellence

1938 births
Living people
21st-century American philosophers
Feminist philosophers
University of Massachusetts Amherst faculty
American women philosophers
Women's studies academics
20th-century American philosophers
Intersectional feminism
Feminist theorists
Critical theorists
21st-century American women